Laura Sánchez may refer to:

 Laura Sánchez (diver) (born 1985), Mexican diver
 Laura Sánchez (swimmer) (born 1972), Mexican swimmer
 Laura Sánchez (model) (born 1981), Spanish model and actress
 Laura Sánchez (badminton) (born 1993), Colombian badminton player